Out of the Ashes is the 11th studio album by American country artist Jessi Colter, released in 2006 on Shout! Factory Records. It was Colter's first album in 10 years, and her first country music album in 22 years since  1984's Rock and Roll Lullaby. It was also her first release since 1981 to chart on the Top Country Albums chart, where it reached #61. It was the first album by Colter to be released following the death of her husband and country artist, Waylon Jennings. The title of the album, Out of the Ashes, explains the message that she has remained an artist without the help of Jennings.

Content
Out of the Ashes consisted of twelve tracks that mixed the genres of country, blues, gospel, and rock. The album was produced by Don Was, who had previously worked with The Rolling Stones and Bob Dylan. The release includes guest appearances from son Shooter Jennings and Tony Joe White. It also includes an unreleased song Colter collaborated on with Jennings in the late 1980s called "Out of the Rain." Before recording the album, Colter specifically went to Don Was with a few songs she had written and asked him what he thought. After telling Colter he was unsure about the songs, she returned to Was with more songs and shortly afterwards, they recorded the album. Six of the songs were written entirely by Colter, four were co-written by her, and two were cover versions of songs: the Gospel song, "His Eye is on the Sparrow" and Bob Dylan's "Rainy Day Women No. 12 and 35."

Critical reception

Allmusic critic, Thom Jurek gave Out of the Ashes a positive review, giving it four out of five stars. Jurek praised the album overall, stating, "Out of the Ashes is a great reflection of the music's tradition, from church pew to the barrom to the lovers' bedroom." Jurek also went on to say, "It is -- after all this time, and six previously celebrated offerings -- the record Colter has been waiting to make all her life and better than anyone ever had any right to expect."

Kathy Coleman of about.com gave Out of the Ashes three and a half out of five stars. Even though the album was given a fairly average rating compared to allmusic's, Coleman gave the release positive feedback instead of constructive criticism. Coleman explained how the release of the album helped Colter overcome Jennings's death, emerging her "from grief into a renewed life." Coleman called the track, "The Phoenix Rises" to sound like, "Jessi does indeed rise like the Phoenix from the ashes." She later summarized the album, stating, "Out of the Ashes is a beautiful record, and a new classic by a true legend."

Entertainment Weekly also reviewed the album. Unlike other websites, music reviewer, Marc Weingarten criticized Out of the Ashes, calling the album to, "sound more like something Rick Rubin might have worked on." Weingarten explained that he felt Colter's "70s sass is gone" and is instead replaced by, "a voice that sounds cured in gospel and cigarettes." Although he did criticize the release, Weingarten found her songwriting skills to be "still intact" for writing "bluesy" and "bittersweet" material.

Track listing
All songs composed by Jessi Colter, except where noted.

"His Eye is on the Sparrow" – 3:58 (Civilla D. Martin, Charles H. Gabriel)
"You Can Pick 'Em" – 4:09 (Colter, Ray Herndon)
"Starman" – 4:23
"The Phoenix Rises" – 4:38
"Out of the Rain" – 4:47 (Tony Joe White)
featuring Waylon Jennings, Shooter Jennings, Tony Joe White, and the Greater Apostolic Christ Temple Choir
"Velvet and Steel" – 4:46
"Rainy Day Women No. 12 & 35" – 4:27 (Bob Dylan)
"You Took Me by Surprise" – 4:37
"So Many Things" – 2:57
"The Canyon" – 4:20
"Never Got Over You" – 3:55 (Colter, Herndon)
"Please Carry Me Home" – 5:51 (Colter, Shooter Jennings) 
with Shooter Jennings

Personnel
 Richie Albright – percussion, drums
 Mike Breen – engineer
 Jerry Bridges – bass
 Alan Cartee – engineer
 Jessi Colter – piano, arranger, wurlitzer
 Steve Crowder – engineer
 Greater Apostolic Christ Temple Choir – background vocals (track 5)
 Jeff Hale – drums
 Ray Herndon – guitar, background vocals
 Jim Horn – saxophone
 Shooter Jennings – background vocals, drums, producer
 Waylon Jennings – background vocals, guitar (track 5)
 Kurt Johnson – harmonica
 Ray Kennedy – bass, organ, percussion
 Jeff Palo – producer
 Barny Robertson – bass, drums, engineer, keyboards
 Carter Robertson – background vocals
 Robby Turner – dobro, pedal steel guitar
 Don Was – producer, upright bass
 Tony Joe White – background vocals, guitar
 Jenny Lynn Young – cello
 Reggie Young – electric guitar

Chart performance

References

2006 albums
Jessi Colter albums
Albums produced by Don Was
Shout! Factory albums